Espen Kofstad (born 11 August 1987) is a Norwegian professional golfer who currently plays on the Challenge Tour.

Kofstad was born in Oslo and was educated at Perbraten School.

After finishing at the University of Denver, he entered the first stage of the European Tour qualifying school in 2010.  At the final stage, he missed qualification for the European Tour by one stroke.

He then joined the Challenge Tour in 2011 and finished in 35th on the Tour's Order of Merit in his rookie season. He picked up his first victory in 2012 at the Double Tree by Hilton Acaya Open. He plays for Losby Golf and Country Club.

He finished 43rd at the 2016 Olympic Summer Games in Rio De Janeiro for Norway.

In 2022, he played in his first PGA Tour Event in the Barbasol Championship, shooting a final round 67 to tie for 16th place.

Amateur wins
2008 Norwegian Amateur
2010 Norwegian Amateur

Professional wins (4)

Challenge Tour wins (4)

1Co-sanctioned by the Nordic Golf League

Challenge Tour playoff record (2–0)

Team appearances
Amateur
European Boys' Team Championship (representing Norway): 2004, 2005
European Amateur Team Championship (representing Norway): 2008, 2009, 2010
Eisenhower Trophy (representing Norway): 2008, 2010
St Andrews Trophy (representing the Continent of Europe): 2010 (winners)

Professional
World Cup (representing Norway): 2013

See also
2012 Challenge Tour graduates
2014 European Tour Qualifying School graduates
2016 European Tour Qualifying School graduates
2021 Challenge Tour graduates
List of golfers with most Challenge Tour wins

References

External links

Profile on Denver's official athletic site
Profile on International Sports Management's official site

Norwegian male golfers
Denver Pioneers men's golfers
European Tour golfers
Olympic golfers of Norway
Golfers at the 2016 Summer Olympics
Sportspeople from Oslo
1987 births
Living people